Erigeron cascadensis is a North American species of flowering plants in the family Asteraceae known by the common name Cascade fleabane. It has been found only in the state of Oregon in the northwestern United States, primarily in subalpine meadows in the Cascades mountain range.

Erigeron cascadensis is a perennial herb up to 15 cm (6 inches) tall, producing a taproot. One plant can produce several flower heads, sometimes one per branch, sometimes in groups of 2 or 3. Each head has 30–50 white or purple ray florets plus numerous yellow disc florets.

References

cascadensis
Flora of Oregon
Plants described in 1900
Flora without expected TNC conservation status

Asteraceae
Endemic flora of Oregon
Endemic flora of the United States